EMD F-units are a line of diesel-electric locomotives produced between November 1939 and November 1960 by General Motors Electro-Motive Division and General Motors-Diesel Division. Final assembly for all F-units was at the GM-EMD plant at La Grange, Illinois, and the GMDD plant in London, Ontario. They were sold to railroads throughout the United States, Canada and Mexico, and a few were exported to Saudi Arabia. The term F-unit refers to the model numbers given to each successive type (i.e. Longer EMD E-units for passenger service had twin  diesel engines (called "prime movers" in that type of application). Similarly, for early model EMD switchers, S meant "six hundred" and N meant "nine hundred horsepower" ( respectively).

F-units were originally designed for freight service, although many without steam generators (for steam-heating passenger cars) pulled short-distance, mainly daytime, passenger trains. Some carriers even equipped small numbers of their Fs with steam generators for long-haul passenger service. On the other hand, Santa Fe maintained a large fleet of fully equipped, high-speed F3s and F7s in "warbonnet" paint schemes built exclusively for top-tier passenger trains, such as the Chief, Super Chief, and El Capitan. Almost all F-units were B-B locomotives, meaning that they ran on two Blomberg B two-axle trucks with all axles powered. The prime mover in F-units was a sixteen-cylinder EMD 567 series mechanically aspirated two-stroke diesel engine, progressing from model 16-567 through 16-567D.

Structurally, the locomotive was a carbody unit, with the body as the main load-bearing structure, designed like a bridge truss and covered with cosmetic panels. The so-called bulldog nose was a distinguishing feature of the locomotive's appearance, and made a lasting impression in the mind of the traveling public.

The F-units were the most successful "first generation" road (main line) diesel locomotives in North America, and were largely responsible for superseding steam locomotives in road freight service. Before that, diesel units were mostly built as switcher locomotives, and only used in rail yards.

F-units were sometimes known as "covered wagons", due to the similarity in appearance of the roof of an F-unit to the canvas roof of a Conestoga wagon, an animal-drawn wagon used in the westward expansion of the United States during the late 18th and 19th centuries. When locomotives on a train included only F-units, the train would then be called a wagon train. Those two usages are still popular with the railfan community.

Models

Model development 
The FT, introduced in 1939 with the new  567 engine and Blomberg B trucks, was a successful design, and remained in production during WWII.

The F3 (1946) had a different roof arrangement that included the replacement of the FT's boxy dynamic brake structure with two under-roof grids, two exhaust stacks instead of four, and four cooling fans grouped together instead of separated pairs of cooling fans. The F3 was also  longer than the FT to allow a standard draft gear to be installed at the rear of the unit. Some F3s were nicknamed "chickenwire" for the type of engine room air-intake structure along the sides.

The F7 (1949) and F9 (1954) were evolutionary: the F7 had improved traction motors, the F9 a  567C engine. A louver arrangement over the vents changed their appearance from the F3.

There were also  versions, the FP7 and FP9, the extra length being used to house a tank for extra water capacity. Only one F model did not have Blomberg B trucks: the FL9 electro-diesel locomotive had a lightweight Flexicoil B in front and a standard passenger A-1-A at the rear. 

Model descriptions are as built, but EMC/EMD locomotives are often rebuilt to newer standards.

Engine and powertrain
The F series used a 16-cylinder version of the 567 series diesel engine, introduced in 1939. A DC generator powered four traction motors, two on each truck. The Blomberg B truck first used in the FT became the EMD production standard, being used until 1995. EMC/EMD built all of its major components after 1939

Passenger service

While the F-unit series was originally conceived for freight service, many were used to haul passenger trains. The original EMC FT demonstrator was equipped with a steam generator in the B units for train heating. Several railroads took advantage of the large space in the rear of their B units to add steam generators. The first FTs built strictly as a passenger unit was the Santa Fe 167 four unit set in February 1945. Learning from that, EMD offered an optional steam generator on all later F unit models. It was mounted at the rear of the carbody; steam-generator equipped locomotives can be recognised by the exhaust stack and safety valves protruding at the rear of the roof.

The F units were popular passenger locomotives on mountain grades (where they were recommended by EMD), because a four-unit set had more motored axles than a trio of E-units of equivalent power (sixteen versus twelve) and thus had less chance of overloading the traction motors. Additionally, that 4-unit F set had all its weight on driven wheels and was thereby capable of greater tractive effort. The AT&SF Super Chief, CB&Q/D&RGW/WP California Zephyr, and GN Empire Builder all used F units on their Chicago-West Coast routes in the 1950s. The F7 was also popular for commuter lines and other passenger service where the trains were short.

Options
There were several options that could be specified by customers, such as type and mounting location of horns and bells.

Dynamic brakes
Dynamic brakes were an option on F units ordered by railroads operating in mountainous terrain and with steep grades.

Passenger or freight pilot
Either a passenger or freight style pilot could be ordered. The passenger pilot, similar to that standard on EMD E units, sloped smoothly down from the bottom of the nose, making a single slope all the way down from the headlight. The coupler was retractable with concealing doors. The result was a very attractive appearance that enhanced the impression of a powerful and speedy machine.

The freight pilot curved inward a little way below the bottom of the nose before sloping out again, to give more clearance to the coupler and hoses. The coupler was
fixed and protruded through a rectangular opening in the pilot.

See also
 CF7 - A rebuild of an EMD F unit by the Atchison, Topeka and Santa Fe Railway.

References

External links 
 Railpage - Australian implementation of the F7

B-B locomotives
F
North American streamliner trains
Diesel-electric locomotives of the United States
Locomotives with cabless variants
Standard gauge locomotives of Canada
Standard gauge locomotives of the United States
Standard gauge locomotives of Mexico
Standard gauge locomotives of Saudi Arabia
Diesel-electric locomotives of Canada
Diesel-electric locomotives of Mexico
Diesel-electric locomotives of Saudi Arabia